The Nini is a river in south-western Ghana. It is one of the rivers for which the Nini-Suhien National Park (now incorporated into the Ankasa Conservation Area) was named. It flows into the Tano River.

References

External links
 GEOnet Names Server
 Tour site with reference to Nini and Suhien Rivers

Rivers of Ghana